In the 1954 Individual Speedway World Championship was the ninth edition of the official World Championship to determine the world champion rider.

Ronnie Moore a 21-year-old New Zealander won his first World Championship with a 15-point maximum in front of a 90,000 attendance. He defeated his main rival Olle Nygren in the final heat. Nygren then lost the silver medal ride off to Wembley's teenager Brian Crutcher. Moore's success was made all the more remarkable because he rode the meeting while still recovering from a broken leg. Moore's win made him New Zealand's first ever World Champion in all forms of motor racing.

Qualification

Nordic Final
3 June 1954
 Oslo
 First 8 to Continental final

Continental Final
20 June 1954
 Linköping
 First 8 to Championship Round

Championship Round

Venues
8 events in Great Britain.

Scores
Top 16 qualify for World final, 17th-18th reserves for World final

World final
16 September 1954
 London, Wembley Stadium

Classification

References

1954
Speedway
1954 in London
Individual Speedway World Championship
Speedway competitions in the United Kingdom